The following is a list of actors, and the characters they played, who appeared in the Netflix series Money Heist.

Overview

Main

Recurring

References

External links
 Money Heist full cast on IMDb

Cast
Money Heist